The flame wrasse, Cirrhilabrus jordani, is a species of wrasse endemic to the Hawaiian Islands where it is found in groups on coral reefs at depths from , though mostly above . It can be found in the aquarium trade.

Etymology
The specific name honours the American ichthyologist David Starr Jordan (1851-1931).

References

jordani
Fish of Hawaii
Endemic fauna of Hawaii
Taxa named by John Otterbein Snyder
Fish described in 1904